Kubera refers to:
 Kubera: the Hindu god of fortune
 Jaroslav Kubera, a Czech politician
 Vaisravana: the Buddhist equivalent of the Hindu deity
 Kuberan (2000 film): the 2000 Tamil film
 Kuberan (2002 film): the 2002 Malayalam film